Land Office (also known as Morristown Library) is a historic office building located at Morristown in St. Lawrence County, New York.  It is a -story limestone building with a pedimented roof built about 1821.  It was the land office for the Chapman family until 1904, when it was deeded to the village for use as a public library.

It was listed on the National Register of Historic Places in 1982.

References

Office buildings on the National Register of Historic Places in New York (state)
Office buildings completed in 1821
Buildings and structures in St. Lawrence County, New York
National Register of Historic Places in St. Lawrence County, New York
1821 establishments in New York (state)